Soye (Sɔ̂y) is a village and commune in the Cercle of Mopti in the Mopti Region of Mali. The commune contains 23 villages and in 2009 had a population of 20,684.

Jamsay Dogon is spoken in Soye. Local surnames include Doumbo.

References

External links
.

Communes of Mopti Region